Sèvre is the name of two rivers in France. Their names are related to the important city they each flow through.

 Sèvre Nantaise, Nantes
 Sèvre Niortaise, Niort

Their origins are both located in the French département Deux-Sèvres (hence the name that means two Sèvres).

See also
 Sèvres